Edge Hill (stylized as Edgehill on some tourism material) is a city in Glascock County, Georgia, United States. The population was 24 at the 2010 census. It is the smallest incorporated city in Georgia by population and ties for the smallest incorporated city in Georgia by area.

History
A post office called Edgehill was established in 1902, and closed in 1903. The Georgia General Assembly incorporated the place on January 1, 1939. The name "Edge Hill" is descriptive of the town site.

Geography

Edge Hill is located at  (33.153078, -82.626635).

Demographics

At the 2000 census there were 30 people, 11 households, and 9 families living in the city. The racial makeup of the city was 96.67% White, and 3.33% from two or more races.
Of the 11 households 45.5% had children under the age of 18 living with them, 90.9% were married couples living together, and 9.1% were non-families. 9.1% of households were one person and none had someone living alone who was 65 or older. The average household size was 2.73 and the average family size was 2.90.

The age distribution was 26.7% under the age of 18, 3.3% from 18 to 24, 23.3% from 25 to 44, 23.3% from 45 to 64, and 23.3% 65 or older. The median age was 44 years. For every 100 females, there were 114.3 males. For every 100 females age 18 and over, there were 83.3 males.

The median household income was $58,125 and the median family income  was $59,375. Males had a median income of $29,375 versus $26,250 for females. The per capita income for the city was $19,409. There were 18.2% of families and 9.3% of the population living below the poverty line, including no under eighteens and 50.0% of those over 64.
According to the 2010 Census, the population of the city was 24, all of which were White.  None were Hispanic and Latino (of any race)

See also

Central Savannah River Area

References

External links
 The News and Farmer and Wadley Herald/ Jefferson Reporter, the county's weekly newspaper and the oldest weekly newspaper in Georgia.

Cities in Georgia (U.S. state)
Cities in Glascock County, Georgia